Calum Jack Woods (born 5 February 1987) is an English professional footballer who plays  as a fullback for Bala Town.

Woods previously spent five seasons with Scottish club Dunfermline Athletic before returning to English football with Huddersfield Town, Preston North End, Bradford City and Tranmere Rovers.

Career

Early career
Woods joined Liverpool youth academy at the age of 10 but failed to break into the first team and was given a free transfer in May 2006.

Dunfermline Athletic
He signed for Dunfermline Athletic after a trial spell alongside fellow former Liverpool player Robbie Foy and played 13 games for the club in his first season. In March 2008, manager Jim McIntyre confirmed that Woods had signed a two-year contract extension. He scored his first goal for Dunfermline on 4 November 2008 when he scored the opener at Airdrie United.

2010–11 season
Woods enjoyed a successful 2010–11 season with Dunfermline, scoring four goals in 37 appearances, in the process helping the Pars achieve promotion to the Scottish Premier League as Champions of Scottish Division One. Woods became the centre of controversy after he was fielded as a substitute when suspended during Dunfermline's 7–1 Scottish Cup fourth round victory over Stenhousemuir.

Huddersfield Town
On 8 June 2011, he joined Football League One side Huddersfield Town on a free transfer, signing a two-year contract. He made his debut in the 1–1 draw with Bury at the Galpharm Stadium on 6 August 2011. Woods switched from his usual position of right back to playing on the left due to the form of right-back Jack Hunt and an injury to regular left-back Gary Naysmith in the second half of the season. Woods went on to make 26 league appearances in his first season with Huddersfield with 31 in all competitions as Huddersfield finished the season as play-off champions winning promotion to the Championship after beating Sheffield United on penalties in the Wembley final. His first goal for the club came two-and-a-half years after he joined, in a 2–1 defeat at AFC Bournemouth at Goldsands on 28 January 2014.

At the end of the 2013–14 season, Woods was not offered a new deal at the club and was subsequently released.

Preston North End
On 9 June 2014, he joined League One club Preston North End.

Bradford City
In January 2019 he signed for Bradford City. In May 2019, following Bradford City's relegation to League Two, it was confirmed that Woods was one of eleven players to be released when their contracts expired.

Tranmere Rovers

On 26 June 2019 he joined another League One club, Tranmere Rovers, on a one-year contract

East Bengal
In December 2020, Woods signed with Indian Super League side SC East Bengal as their eighth foreigner. He joined the club in mid season and had not appeared in any match.

Career statistics

Honours
Dunfermline Athletic
Scottish Football League First Division: 2010–11

Huddersfield Town
Football League One play-offs: 2012

Preston North End
Football League One play-offs: 2015

References

External links
 

1987 births
Living people
Footballers from Liverpool
English footballers
Association football defenders
Liverpool F.C. players
Dunfermline Athletic F.C. players
Huddersfield Town A.F.C. players
Preston North End F.C. players
Bradford City A.F.C. players
Tranmere Rovers F.C. players
Scottish Premier League players
Scottish Football League players
English Football League players
Northern Premier League players
F.C. United of Manchester players
Expatriate footballers in India
East Bengal Club players